Australian Rules Football is an Australian rules football video game developed by Keith A Goodyer and published by Alternative Software. It was released in 1989 for the Commodore 64, ZX Spectrum and Amstrad CPC.

References

Notes

External links
Australian Rules Football at GB64.COM

1989 video games
Alternative Software games
Amstrad CPC games
Australia-exclusive video games
Australian rules football video games
Commodore 64 games
Multiplayer and single-player video games
Video games developed in the United Kingdom
Video games set in Australia
ZX Spectrum games